Mercier and Camier is a novel by Samuel Beckett that was written in 1946, but remained unpublished until 1970. Appearing immediately before his celebrated "trilogy" of Molloy, Malone Dies and The Unnamable, Mercier et Camier was Beckett's first attempt at extended prose fiction in French.  Beckett refused to publish it in its original French until 1970, and while an English translation by Beckett himself was published in 1974 (London: Calder and Boyars and New York: Grove Press), the author had made substantial alterations to and deletions from the original text while "reshaping" it from French to English.

The novel features the "pseudocouple" Mercier and his friend, the private investigator Camier, in their repeated attempts to leave a city, a thinly disguised version of Dublin, only to abandon their journey and return. Frequent visits are paid to "Helen's Place," a tawdry house modeled on that of legendary Dublin madam Becky Cooper (much like Becky Cooper, Helen has a talking parrot). A much-changed Watt makes a cameo appearance, bringing his stick down on a pub table and yelling "Fuck life!"

As any actor ever been blessed to have played the beasties in question would jump to point out:  Mercier et Camier was abandoned by Beckett in order to pick up sculpturing the labyrinth of Godot.  The two pieces form each others backstory.  M+C disappear every afternoon to perform unspecified tasks; Gogo and Didi plod out onto the heath and linger until nightfall.  Reading the one to prep the other does all ones actor's homework in one fell swoop.

References

External links
 Keith Ridgway on Mercier and Camier The Guardian 19 July 2003

1946 novels
Novels by Samuel Beckett
Novels set in Dublin (city)
1970 novels